Zeilinga Strydom (born 5 May 2001) is a South African rugby union player for the  in the Currie Cup. His regular position is wing.

Strydom was named in the  side for the 2022 Currie Cup Premier Division.

References

South African rugby union players
Living people
Rugby union wings
Golden Lions players
2001 births
Rugby union players from the Free State (province)